Solomon Cohen Sr. (October 13, 1757 – May 23, 1835) was a distinguished merchant and prominent citizen of both Charleston, South Carolina, and Savannah, Georgia, in the 18th and 19th centuries. He was also a slave owner.

Life and career 
Cohen was born in Charleston, Province of South Carolina, on October 13, 1757, to Moses Cohen and Dinah Congue. His father, born in England in 1709, was a founder and the first Rabbi of Temple Beth Elohim in Georgetown, South Carolina. His is the oldest tombstone in Charleston's Coming Street Cemetery.

He married Bella Moses, daughter of Myer Moses and Rachel Andrews, in 1796. Their son, Solomon Cohen Jr., became a noted lawyer in Savannah. Their daughter, Sarah Henrietta, married Savannah's Mordecai Myers II.

Cohen became a merchant and civic leader in Georgetown. He was also a slave owner, at one point "holding nine African citizens against their will." In a letter to his sister-in-law Emma Mordecai (sister of Mordecai Myers I, who married Cohen's sister, Esther), he wrote:

Death 
Cohen died on May 23, 1835, aged 77. He is interred in Savannah's Laurel Grove Cemetery, alongside his wife, who survived him by 27 years.

References 

1757 births
1835 deaths
Jewish-American slave owners
People from Charleston, South Carolina
People from Savannah, Georgia